Jean-Sélim Kanaan (July 28, 1970 – August 19, 2003) was a United Nations diplomat, Egyptian, Italian and French national, who was killed in the Canal Hotel bombing in Baghdad, Iraq, along with  Sérgio Vieira de Mello and other members of his staff. Born in Rome, Italy, he was the son of an Egyptian UN diplomat, and he spoke seven languages.

Biography 
Kanaan devoted his life to humanitarian relief operations from the age of 23 until his death. In 1996 he graduated from Harvard Kennedy School with a Master of Public Policy, after graduating in business with a MBA Institute in Paris in 1992. Before that, he served in Mogadishu, Somalia, in 1992, and the following year, as a relief coordinator for Médecins du Monde in central Bosnia. In his first assignment with the UN from 1996 to 1998, he was employed by the UNOPS and served with the UN’s director of peacekeeping operations in Bosnia as the Assistant Programme Coordinator, and, from 1999 to 2000, in the UN Interim Administration Mission in Kosovo as an assistant to Bernard Kouchner, the UN's special representative to Kosovo. Following Kosovo, and until his mission in Iraq (2003), Kanaan worked with UNOSAT at the UN Headquarters in New York City where he was managing policy questions promoting the use of GIS and other novel technologies for peacekeeping operations.  In 2002, he published a book, Ma guerre à L’indifference, (English: My war against indifference), with a preface written by Christine Ockrent. He climbed Mount Kilimanjaro and was an aviator.

Kanaan left behind his wife, Laura Dolci-Kanaan, and his three-week-old baby, Mattias-Sélim Kanaan. He was buried in a Roman Catholic cemetery in Cairo, Egypt: "Jean Sélim, martire della pace e dell'umanesimo".

Kanaan was awarded the French Legion of Honour posthumously for his work in "helping the world's weak and oppressed".

See also
Attacks on humanitarian workers

References 
   Canal hotel tribute edition, page 14-15
   tribute
 UN Press Release Kanaan awarded French Legion of Honour

External links 
  UN Press Release Kofi Annan pays tribute to Harvard Kennedy School
 Tribute
 Photo album
Awarded the legion of honour
  French mission to the UN  
Book
 Ma guerre à l'indifférence  
 La mia guerra all'indifferenza 
Film
 Génération ONU Starring Kanaan
 Yle.fi review

Kanaan,Jean-Selim
Kanaan,Jean-Selim
Harvard Kennedy School alumni
French philanthropists
Egyptian diplomats
Italian officials of the United Nations
French terrorism victims
Egyptian terrorism victims
Italian terrorism victims
People killed in the Canal Hotel bombing
Chevaliers of the Légion d'honneur
Egyptian officials of the United Nations
French officials of the United Nations
20th-century philanthropists